Oravská Polhora is a large village and municipality in Námestovo District in the Žilina Region of northern Slovakia. The northernmost point of Slovakia is located close to the village.

History
In historical records the village was first mentioned in 1580.
Natural heritage is a complex of forests, as well as iodine-bromine springs known as spa salt water. They were known in the neighborhood and the rumor was brought to Vienna.
Source location in Oravská Polhora - Slaná Voda (Saltwater) already mentioned in 1550 in a handwritten map of Orava. Of the Upper Ungarn  chamber, the view that undermines the right of the king's salt monopoly, the king sent two commissioners and  Andreas Kraiser and Joseph Milaver, from Hallstadt. They were experts in extracting salt. To be accompanied by salt water census customs station manager of Tvrdosin. Commissioners have written extensively on the visit of the sources and report it to enclose a handwritten map of surrounding area. On the map, which is the oldest map projection upper Orava Orava is plotted Polhora (Pagus Polgora) and other municipalities. 
A written report on the map binds primarily salt water spring, which is plotted on the map south of the Babia Hora mountain (Mons Baba) as well walled area Rabča territory of the village. (Pagus Rapcia). In the inscription Puteus salsus intra fines Rapciae possession.
The economic data is to map note, according to which the Beskydy and deposits of gold, silver, lead and other metals. In montibus istis aurum, argentum, et aes plumbum alique metal reperire est.

Geography
The municipality lies at an altitude of 688 metres and covers an area of 84.519 km². It has a population of about 3,635 people.

ir:Oravská Polhora

Villages and municipalities in Námestovo District